Cambria Heights Academy or Cambria Heights Academy for New Literacies or Q326 is a secondary school in Queens, New York City, United States, serving grades 9 through 12. It is in New York City Schools Geographic District 29.

Cambria Heights Academy is named after the area of Queens that it serves, Cambria Heights.

Statistics 
The school has a student population of 370. Of those, 55% are male and 45% are female. The ethnic makeup of the school is 10% Hispanic or Latino, 15% Asian, 72% African-American, and 2% White.

History 
The school opened in 2010 under the current principal, Melissa Menake. The school's dress code is "solid-colored, collared shirt; black, blue or khaki dress pants/skirt; black or brown belt; solid black shoes/sneakers."

References 

Public high schools in Queens, New York